The 21st Air Division (21st AD) is an inactive United States Air Force organization. Its last assignment was with Tactical Air Command, being stationed at Griffiss Air Force Base, New York. It was inactivated on 23 September 1983.

History

World War II
Initially established in 1942 as the 21st Bombardment Wing, the organization functioned as a staging wing for Second Air Force, and later as a command, processing heavy bombardment crews and aircraft for overseas movement, and then processing men returning from overseas, from 1942–1946.

Air Force Reserve
From December 1946, it performed routine training duties in the Air Force Reserve through 27 June 1949 when it was inactivated due to budget reductions.

Strategic Air Command
Reactivated as an intermediate command echelon of Strategic Air Command in February 1951 at Forbes Air Force Base, Kansas. The 21st Air Division controlled B-47 Stratojet medium bombardment wings at Forbes and Lake Charles Air Force Base, Louisiana. It was responsible for aircrew training, bomber replacement crews, and replacements for strategic reconnaissance slots until September 1964 when the B-47 was phased out of the inventory.

Air Defense Command

The command was reactivated by Air Defense Command (ADC) in January 1966 at McGuire Air Force Base, New Jersey as one of ten new Air Divisions organized by the command to replace inactivating Air Defense Sectors in an organizational realignment. Assumed additional designation of 21st NORAD Region after activation of the NORAD Combat Operations Center at the Cheyenne Mountain Complex, Colorado and reporting was transferred to NORAD from ADC at Ent Air Force Base in April 1966.

Under ADC the 21st AD was placed under First Air Force and assumed the jurisdiction of the former New York Air Defense Sector, controlling interceptor and radar units over eastern Pennsylvania, New Jersey, the New York City/Long Island area and the coast of Connecticut, Rhode Island and Massachusetts, including Cape Cod. This included operations of the Semi Automatic Ground Environment (SAGE) blockhouse DC-01.  For operational control the division was also the 21st NORAD/CONRAD Region.

During this time, it participated in air defense training exercises, accomplished live and simulated intercepts, and directed numerous flying sorties until inactivation in December 1967 as part of an ADC consolidation of intermediate level command and control organizations, driven by budget reductions required to fund USAF operations in Southeast Asia.

The 21st AD was reactivated in November 1969 under Aerospace Defense Command (ADCOM) at Hancock Field, New York. The command provided air defense over most of Pennsylvania, New Jersey, New York and the New England area, commanding interceptor and radar stations. Also included were ADCOM radar stations located in Newfoundland, Canada. In addition command of the SAGE DC-03/CC-01 blockhouse was assumed by the 21st AD, as well as CIM-10 Bomarc surface-to-air anti-aircraft missile squadrons near Otis Air Force Base, Massachusetts, Niagara Falls Air Force Missile Site, New York and McGuire Air Force Base, New Jersey.

In 1975, a new JCS Unified Command Plan designated Air Defense Command as a specified command and changed its name to the Aerospace Defense Command (ADCOM) on 1 July 1975.  The division assumed additional designation 21st ADCOM Region for operational control on 8 December 1978.  Air Defense ADCOM was reorganized on 1 October 1979. The atmospheric defense resources (interceptors and warning radars) of ADCOM. including the 21st AD were reassigned to Tactical Air Command (ADTAC). It moved to Griffiss Air Force Base, New York in 1983 when Hancock Field was closed.

In 1983, when the air defense mission of CONUS was reassigned to the Air National Guard, the 21st Air Division (ADTAC) was inactivated and its assets transferred to Northeast Air Defense Sector.

Lineage
 Established as the 21st Bombardment Wing on 16 December 1942
 Activated on 22 December 1942
 Redesignated I Staging Command on 27 September 1945
 Inactivated on 3 April 1946
 Activated in the Reserve on 20 December 1946
 Redesignated: 21st Bombardment Wing, Very Heavy on 31 December 1946
 Redesignated: 21st Air Division, Bombardment on 16 April 1948
 Inactivated on 27 June 1949
 Redesignated 21st Air Division on 5 February 1951
 Activated on 16 February 1951
 Inactivated on 8 April 1952
 Organized on 8 April 1952
 Discontinued on 16 October 1952
 Activated on 16 October 1952
 Redesignated 21st Strategic Aerospace Division on 15 February 1962
 Discontinued and inactivated on 1 September 1964
 Activated on 20 January 1966 (not organized)
 Organized on 1 April 1966
 Discontinued and inactivated on 31 December 1967
 Activated on 19 November 1969
 Inactivated on 23 September 1983

Assignments

 Second Air Force, 22 December 1942
 Continental Air Forces, 18 July 1945
 Fourth Air Force, 19 November 1945 – 3 April 1946
 Fourteenth Air Force, 20 December 1946
 Ninth Air Force, 22 December 1948
 Fourteenth Air Force, 1 February – 27 June 1949

 Fifteenth Air Force, 16 July 1952
 Eighth Air Force, 1 July 1955
 Second Air Force, 1 January 1959 – 1 September 1964
 First Air Force, 1 April 1966 – 31 December 1967
 Aerospace Defense Command, 19 November 1969
 Air Defense, Tactical Air Command, 1 October 1979 – 23 September 1983

Stations
 Smoky Hill Army Air Field, Kansas, 22 December 1942
 Topeka Army Air Field, Kansas, 31 May 1943
 Merced Army Air Field (later Castle Field), California, 7 October 1945 – 3 April 1946
 Memphis Municipal Airport, Tennessee, 20 December 1946 – 27 June 1949
 Forbes Air Force Base, Kansas, 16 February 1951 – 1 September 1964
 McGuire Air Force Base, New Jersey, 1 April 1966 – 31 December 1967
 Hancock Field, New York 19 November 1969
 Griffiss Air Force Base, New York, 31 August – 23 September 1983

Components

World War II
 48th Staging Wing: 18 July 1945 – c. 21 March 1946
 95th Bombardment Group: 29 May 1947 – 27 June 1949
 333d Bombardment Group: attached 15 July 1942 – 21 February 1943
 346th Bombardment Group: attached 7 September 1942 – 25 February 1943
 384th Bombardment Group: 16 July 1947 – 27 June 1949

Strategic Air Command

 40th Bombardment Wing (later 40 Strategic Aerospace Wing): 20 June 1960 – 1 September 1964
 44th Bombardment Wing
 Lake Charles Air Force Base, Louisiana, 4 August 1951 – 8 April 1952. 8 April – 16 June 1952
 55th Strategic Reconnaissance Wing: 1 – 16 October 1952; 16 October 1952 – 1 September 1964
 68th Strategic Reconnaissance Wing
 Lake Charles Air Force Base, Louisiana, 10 October 1951 – 8 April 1952. 8 April – c. 15 May 1952

 90th Bombardment Wing (later 90 Strategic Reconnaissance Wing):14 March 1951 – 8 April 1952. 8 April – 16 October 1952. 16 October 1952 – 20 June 1960.
 308th Bombardment Wing:10 October 1951 – 8 April 1952; 8 – 17 April 1952
 310th Bombardment Wing: attached: 28 March – 4 September 1952
 376th Bombardment Wing:attached: 1 June – 10 October 1951

 373d Bombardment Squadron:  attached 10 October 1951 – 8 April 1952; 8 – 17 April 1952
 374th Bombardment Squadron: attached 10 October 1951 – 8 April 1952; 8 – 17 April 1952
 375th Bombardment Squadron: attached 10 October 1951 – 8 April 1952; 8 – 17 April 1952

Air Defense Command
 Air Forces Iceland: 31 December 1969 – 1 October 1975

Fighter-Interceptor units
 52d Fighter Wing
 Suffolk County Air Force Base, New York, 1 April 1966 – 1 December 1967
 551st Airborne Early Warning and Control Wing
 Otis Air Force Base, Massachusetts, 4 – 31 December 1969

 27th Fighter-Interceptor Squadron
 Loring Air Force Base, Maine, 19 November 1969 – 1 July 1971
 49th Fighter-Interceptor Squadron
 Griffiss Air Force Base, New York, 19 November 1969 – 23 September 1983
 60th Fighter-Interceptor Squadron
 Otis Air Force Base, Massachusetts, 19 November 1969 – 30 April 1971
 83d Fighter-Interceptor Squadron
 Loring Air Force Base, Maine, 1 July 1971 – 30 June 1972

 87th Fighter-Interceptor Squadron
 K. I. Sawyer Air Force Base, Michigan, 1 August 1981 – 23 September 1983
 95th Fighter-Interceptor Squadron
 Dover Air Force Base, Delaware, 1 April 1966 – 1 December 1967
 539th Fighter-Interceptor Squadron
 McGuire Air Force Base, New Jersey, 1 April 1966 – 31 August 1967

Missile units
 26th Air Defense Missile Squadron (BOMARC)
 Otis Air Force Base, Massachusetts, 19 November 1969 – 30 April 1972
 35th Air Defense Missile Squadron (BOMARC)
 Niagara Falls Air Force Missile Site, New York, 19 November – 31 December 1969
 46th Air Defense Missile Squadron (BOMARC)
 McGuire Air Force Base, New Jersey, 1 April 1966 – 1 December 1967; 19 November 1969 – 31 October 1972

Radar units
 12th Missile Warning Group
 Thule Air Base, Greenland, 1 October 1976 – 1 October 1979
 762d Air Defense Group
 North Truro Air Force Station, Massachusetts, 1 March 1970 – 1 January 1974
 765th Air Defense Group
 Charleston Air Force Station, Maine, 1 March 19790 – 1 January 1974

 6th Missile Warning Squadron
 Otis Air Force Base, Massachusetts, 1 October 1978 – 1 October 1979
 640th Aircraft Control and Warning Squadron
 Stephenville Air Station, Newfoundland, Canada, 31 March 1970 – 30 June 1971
 641st Aircraft Control and Warning Squadron
 Melville Air Station, Labrador, Canada, 31 March 1970 – 30 June 1971
 648th Radar Squadron
 Highlands Air Force Station, New Jersey, 1 April – 1 July 1966
 648th Radar Squadron
 Benton Air Force Station, Pennsylvania, 19 November 1969 – 30 June 1975
 655th Radar Squadron
 Watertown Air Force Station, New York, 19 November 1969 – 8 December 1978
 656th Radar Squadron
 Saratoga Springs Air Force Station, 19 November 1969 – 30 June 1977
 680th Radar Squadron
 Palermo Air Force Station, New Jersey, 19 November 1969 – 30 May 1970
 763d Radar Squadron
 Lockport Air Force Station, New York, 19 November 1969 – 8 December 1978

 764th Radar Squadron
 Saint Albans Air Force Station, Vermont, 19 November 1969 – 8 December 1978
 765th Radar Squadron
 Charleston Air Force Station, Maine, 19 November 1969 – 8 December 1978
 766th Radar Squadron
 Caswell Air Force Station, Maine, 19 November 1969 – 8 December 1978
 772d Radar Squadron
 Gibbsboro Air Force Station, New Jersey, 1 April 1966 – 1 December 1967; 19 November 1969 – 8 December 1978
 773d Radar Squadron
 Montauk Air Force Station, New Jersey, 1 April 1966 – 1 December 1967; 19 November 1969 – 8 December 1978
 907th Radar Squadron
 Bucks Harbor Air Force Station, Maine, 19 November 1969 – 30 June 1979
 924th Aircraft Control and Warning Squadron
 Saglek Air Station, Labrador, Canada, 31 March 1970 – 30 June 1971

Air Base units
 4683d Air Base Group
 Thule Air Base, Greenland, 31 December 1969 – 31 March 1977
 4684th Air Base Group
 Sondrestrom Air Base, Greenland, 31 December 1969 – 1 December 1979

Emblem
The Division's emblem consists of a Shield divided by a diagonal line from the upper right to middle left, light blue and white, a sword slanting from upper left to lower right, the point to lower right base, the hilt and pommel yellow encircled with five stars, yellow, the lower blade of the sword over a branch of olive in base green. (Approved 17 July 1952)

See also

 List of United States Air Force Aerospace Defense Command Interceptor Squadrons
 List of United States Air Force air divisions
 United States general surveillance radar stations

References

Notes

Bibliography

 
 
 
 
 "ADCOM's Fighter Interceptor Squadrons". The Interceptor (January 1979) Aerospace Defense Command, (Volume 21, Number 1)

Military units and formations established in 1942
Units and formations of Strategic Air Command
021
021
1942 establishments in Kansas